Lorenzo Cavelle Styles (born January 31, 1974) is a former professional American football player who played linebacker for six seasons for the Atlanta Falcons and St. Louis Rams, and spent half a season as the Head Coach of the Marion Blue Racers.

Early life
As a prep star at Farrell High School in Farrell, Pennsylvania from 1990 and 1991, Styles was inducted into the Mercer County Hall of Fame. He also attended Independence High School in Columbus, Ohio

College career
Styles played three seasons at linebacker for Ohio State. He forsook his senior season as a Buckeye to enter  the 1995 NFL Draft.

Professional career

Atlanta Falcons
Styles was selected in the third round of the 1995 NFL Draft by the Atlanta Falcons. He played for two seasons with the Falcons as linebacker and on special teams.

St. Louis Rams
Styles was traded to the St. Louis Rams in 1996, where he would play the final four seasons of his NFL career as a linebacker and special teams player. Styles was a member of the Rams team that won Super Bowl XXXIV.

Coaching career

Ohio Dominican
In 2009 and 2010, Styles was the linebackers' coach for the Ohio Dominican University Panthers.

Marion Mayhem
In 2010, Styles was named the defensive line coach for the Marion Mayhem, an indoor football team in the Continental Indoor Football League. There he worked with league sack record holder, Thomas McKenzie. The Mayhem lacked financial stability and were unable to finish the season. McKenzie went on to play for the Fort Wayne FireHawks, and was named 1st Team All-CIFL.

Dayton Silverbacks
In 2011, Styles became the defensive coordinator and defensive backs coach for the Dayton Silverbacks, also of the CIFL. The Silverbacks went on to the playoffs as the 3rd best team in the league. Chris Respress won the Defensive Player of the Year after playing under Styles.

Marion Blue Racers
On August 17, 2011, Styles was named the Head Coach for the Marion Blue Racers for the 2012 season. He led the Blue Racers into their first year as a member of the United Indoor Football League.

Pickerington Central Tigers
In 2012, Styles became outside linebacker coach for the Pickerington Central Tigers, a high school football team in the OCC (Ohio Capital Conference), and was on staff as the Tigers won Division I state championships in 2017 and 2019. In the 2019 state championship game, Styles' son Lorenzo Jr., who later signed with Notre Dame, caught the game-winning touchdown pass.

References

1974 births
American football linebackers
Ohio State Buckeyes football players
St. Louis Rams players
Atlanta Falcons players
Living people